Traditi humilitati is a papal encyclical issued by Pope Pius VIII in 1829. It laid out the program for his pontificate. Although it does not explicitly mention Freemasonry, it has been cited by later Church documents on the subject because it condemned those "who think that the portal of eternal salvation opens for all from any religion".

Regarding religious pluralism, Pius VIII condemned the "foul contrivance of the sophists of this age" that would place Catholicism on a par with any other religion. Regarding Bible translations, he wrote:

See also  
 Anti-Masonry
 Opposition to Freemasonry within Christianity
 Position of the Catholic Church on Freemasonry

References

External links
Text of Traditi humilitati

Catholicism and Freemasonry
Papal encyclicals
1829 documents
1829 in Christianity
Documents of Pope Pius VIII